Akhil (born 3 May 1988) is an Indian actor who has appeared in Tamil language films. He made his debut in the 2007 film, Kalloori, directed by Balaji Sakthivel.

Career
The actor made his debut in Balaji Sakthivel's critically acclaimed film Kalloori (2007) alongside Tamannaah  and produced by S. Shankar. The film opened to positive reviews and Akhil subsequently won a nomination for the Vijay Award for Best Debut Actor category. He was next seen in Vaalmiki (2009) alongside Meera Nandan but the film opened to negative reviews, while Nandhi (2011) alongside Sanusha also released with little publicity. In 2013, he played in the supernatural horror thriller film,  Masani. His following films were Dhanush 5am Vaguppu (2014), Rettai Vaalu (2014) and Kalkandu (2014).

In 2016, he appeared in Azhagu Kutti Chellam which received positive reviews followed by Ilami where he has brilliantly transformed as a menacing villain in this film. His other films include Pagadi Aattam (2017), Padaiveeran (2018), Alai Pesi (2018), 50 Roova (2019) and Engada Iruthinga Ivvalavu Naala (2021).

Filmography

Music videos

References

External links
 Akhil on Twitter

People from Dindigul district
Indian male film actors
Tamil male actors
Living people
1988 births
Male actors in Tamil cinema
21st-century Indian actors